Mario Büttner (born 23 November 1967) is a German wrestler. He competed in the men's Greco-Roman 62 kg at the 1992 Summer Olympics.

References

External links
 

1967 births
Living people
German male sport wrestlers
Olympic wrestlers of Germany
Wrestlers at the 1992 Summer Olympics
Sportspeople from Luckenwalde